Darren Davis (born 5 February 1967) is an English former professional footballer who played for Maidstone United, Notts County, Lincoln City and Scarborough.

In June 2002 he was appointed manager of Gedling Town.
He is currently Assistant Manager of the Notts County's Centre of Excellence.

References

1967 births
Living people
Sportspeople from Sutton-in-Ashfield
Footballers from Nottinghamshire
Association football defenders
English footballers
Notts County F.C. players
Lincoln City F.C. players
Maidstone United F.C. (1897) players
Boston United F.C. players
Frickley Athletic F.C. players
Scarborough F.C. players
Grantham Town F.C. players
Rugby Town F.C. players
Hucknall Town F.C. players
English Football League players